Boli is a Bangladeshi crime drama streaming television series created by Sarder Saniat Hossain, Robiul Alam Robi and Naseef Faruque Amin that released on Hoichoi on 3 December 2021. All the episodes of the series has been directed by Shankha Dasgupta. Which stars Chanchal Chowdhury, Sohana Saba, Safa Kabir, Salahuddin Lavlu, Lutfur Rahman George, and Iresh Zaker.

Premise 
Boli, Hoichoi TV’s latest series from Bangladesh, is a twist in the legendary Persian tale of ‘Rustom And Sohrab’. Crime lord Sohrab Chanchal Chowdhury rules the island of Cheradiya with a brutal hand. Lawlessness thrives, and Sohrab’s guns and gunmen do all the talking. Into this wildworld lands an injured stranger (Shohel Rana), who's lost his memory. The local brothel inmates nurse him back to health and give him the name, Rustom. Will Rustom spell the end of Sohrab’s reign of terror?

Cast
 Chanchal Chowdhury as Sohrab Company
 Shohel Mondol as Rustom
 Sohana Saba as Anarkali
 Safa Kabir as Ayesha
 Salahuddin Lavlu as Mojid Company
 Ziaul Hoque Polash as Nizam
 Nasir Uddin Khan as Shahjahan Boli
 Lutfur Rahman George as Selim Chairman
 Iresh Zaker as Joynal Hujur
 Kazi Roksana Ruma as Mata Mohuri
 Rishad Mahmud as Police

Production
Principal photography has taken place in various locations of Kuakata in Patuakhali district and Manikganj district of Bangladesh in September 2021.

Release
Boli aired on Hoichoi on 3 December 2021, all the episodes has been available immediately.

Reception
The series mostly got negative to mixed reviews from critics and audiences. Aysha Zaheen from The Daily Star criticized the dialogues and the direction and said, ""Boli" was merely an attempt at producing a good crime thriller, falling short in many places. Often stretched out with lengthy shots, unnecessary dialogues, and unreasonable plotlines, the series fails to get its point across throughout the span of seven inconsistent episodes". Leisure Byte reviewer Archi Sengupta gave the series 2 out of 5 and said, "It's entertaining but loses all of its steam quickly, becoming a mess of a show without much rhyme or reason. Also, just so much dialogue, just so much unnecessary dialogue!"

Episodes

Awards

References

External links
 

Bengali-language web series
2021 web series debuts
2021 Bangladeshi television series debuts
Bangladeshi web series
Bangladeshi crime drama television series
Hoichoi original programming